= Titus Flavius Vespasianus =

Titus Flavius Vespasianus may refer to two Roman emperors:

- The elder Titus Flavius Vespasianus, who took the name Caesar Vespasianus Augustus, and is better known in English as the emperor Vespasian
- his son, Titus Flavius Vespasianus, known as the emperor Titus
